Canadian Cinema was a Canadian television series about films which aired on CBC Television in 1974.

Premise
Feature films from Canada were presented in this series:

 21 July: The Rowdyman (1972)
 28 July: Journey (1972)
 4 August: Mon oncle Antoine (1971)
 11 August: Between Friends (1973)
 18 August: Isabel (1968)
 25 August: The Visitor (1974)

Scheduling
This series was broadcast in a two-hour time slot on Sundays at 9:00 p.m. (Eastern) from 21 July to 25 August 1974.

References

External links
 

CBC Television original programming
1974 Canadian television series debuts
1974 Canadian television series endings